{{Infobox Historic building
|name= Island Theatre formerly the Island Roxy
|image= Island Roxy Front 01.jpg
|caption= Island Theatre
|map_type= 
|latitude=
|longitude=
|location_town= 4074 Main StreetChincoteague, Virginia
|location_country= United States
|architect= 
|client= 
|engineer=
|construction_start_date= 1945
|completion_date= 1947<ref name=CIAO>Chincoteague Island Arts Organization.  "Information: Island  Theatre, Chincoteague, Virginia", Chincoteague Island Arts Organization.</ref>
|date_demolished=
|cost= 
|structural_system=
|style= Art Deco
|size= 352 seats 
}}

The Island Theatre is a historic U.S. building located at 4074 Main Street, Chincoteague, Virginia. It still serves as an operational movie theater. Originally named Island Theatre, the theatre was renamed Island Roxy from the 1980s until the name was reverted to Island Theatre in 2013. 

 History 
The theater, a Art Deco building, opened in 1945.

 Misty 

In 1960, 20th Century Fox filmed the movie Misty'' on location at Chincoteague. In the same town, at the premiere of the film, in 1961, the star of the film, a Chincoteague Pony named Misty of Chincoteague marched down the aisles of the theater before the showing. The town memorialized Misty by encasing her hoofprints in concrete in front of the theatre (see image).Every year, the film is screened for free at the theatre.

Notes

Art Deco architecture in Virginia
Chincoteague, Virginia
Cinemas and movie theaters in Virginia
Buildings and structures in Accomack County, Virginia
Theatres completed in 1945